The England Lions cricket team toured the Windies A, playing 3 first-class matches and 3 limited over fixtures between 11 February 2018 and 11 March 2018.

Test Series

Squads

1st Unofficial Test

2nd Unofficial Test

3rd Unofficial Test

ODI Series

Squads

1st Unofficial ODI

2nd Unofficial ODI

3rd Unofficial ODI

See also
 England National Cricket Team

References

A team cricket
2018 in cricket